Zamojsce  (Zamistia) is a village in the administrative district of Gmina Radymno, within Jarosław County, Subcarpathian Voivodeship, in south-eastern Poland, close to the border with Ukraine.

The village was founded in the second half of the 14th century, and has a population of 290

References

Zamojsce